"Heaven for Everyone" is a song written by Queen drummer Roger Taylor. It originally appeared on his side project the Cross's album Shove It, with Freddie Mercury as a guest vocalist, and it is the album's fourth track. It was reworked with Queen's music and appeared in the 1995 album Made in Heaven where it was the seventh track, and was released as the first single – four years after Mercury's death. Queen's version reached number two on the UK Singles Chart while peaking at number one in Hungary and becoming a top-ten hit in several other European nations. In 1999 it was included in Queen’s compilation album Greatest Hits III.

Directed by David Mallet, the music video opens with images of graffiti messages in tribute to Mercury outside his home, Garden Lodge, Kensington in London, before showing footage of Georges Méliès seminal 1902 silent film A Trip to the Moon and The Impossible Voyage (1904).

Background and writing
Some reports have Taylor writing the song in 1986 as part of Queen's A Kind of Magic album sessions, after their work on Highlander was complete. If he did, the song was not used, or was incomplete when the album was finished.

When Taylor started working on the album Shove It, he recruited Freddie Mercury to record backing vocals. Two versions were recorded, one with Mercury doing backing to Taylor's lead vocals, and another with Mercury singing lead. The backing track of each was rerecorded as well, instead of the two lead vocals being recorded over the same instrumental backing. The Taylor-vocal version is about twenty seconds longer than the Mercury-vocal version.

The Cross versions also feature a spoken intro by Taylor, as well as a spoken refrain in the middle. The refrain in the Taylor vocal has an extra lyric not sung in the Mercury-vocal version (though it appears in the printed lyrics). Both versions end with Taylor saying "And that. Is the end. Of this section."  

The UK edition of the album Shove It featured Mercury's vocal version, while the UK single featured Taylor's vocal version. In the US, the album featured Taylor's vocal version and neither were released as a single.

The song, Taylor noted, "had some good stuff about love and dignity; the usual antiwar thing."

After Freddie Mercury's death, as Queen prepared to complete their posthumous album, Made in Heaven, this song was selected to be re-done by the band as a Queen song. The lead vocal Mercury recorded in 1987 was given a new backing track and new backing vocals. A significant difference between The Cross versions and the Queen version is that there's no spoken introduction, refrain or "end" as done by Taylor on the original.

Critical reception

1995 Queen version
British magazine Music Week rated Queen's version of the song four out of five, adding, "Four years in the making, Freddie Mercury's final work has resurfaced with the long-awaited album Made in Heaven due in November, from which comes this emotional ballad with all the signs of a big hit."

Music video

Queen's music video for the song commemorates Mercury. It was directed by David Mallet and released in 1995. The video opens with images of the graffiti covered walls of Mercury's home, Garden Lodge, Kensington, before showing footage from the films A Trip to the Moon (Le Voyage dans la Lune, 1902), The Impossible Voyage (Le Voyage à travers l'impossible, 1904) and The Eclipse, or the Courtship of the Sun and Moon (L'éclipse du soleil en pleine lune, 1907) by Georges Méliès.

A second music video for the song, directed by Simon Pummell was included on the Made in Heaven: The Films VHS and features Cypriot-Australian performance artist Stelarc operating a robotic "third hand" to symbolise a new era of man and machine.

The music video for the Cross version involved Taylor singing the song on a beach-like setting, while elderly people walked past the band and climbed up ladders to reach heaven.

Track listings

1988 The Cross single releases
Track listings are sourced from ultimatequeen.co.uk.

UK 7-inch single
 "Heaven for Everyone" (Roger Taylor vocals)
 "Love on a Tightrope"

UK 12-inch single
 "Heaven for Everyone" (Roger Taylor vocals)
 "Love on a Tightrope"
 "Contact"

1995 Queen single releases
Track listings are sourced from ultimatequeen.co.uk.

UK CD 1
 "Heaven for Everyone" (single version) – 4:37
 "It's a Beautiful Day" (single version) – 3:57
 "Heaven for Everyone" (album version) – 5:36

UK CD 2
 "Heaven for Everyone" (single version) – 4:37
 "Keep Yourself Alive" – 3:46
 "Seven Seas of Rhye" – 2:46
 "Killer Queen" – 2:59

UK cassette
 "Heaven for Everyone" (single version) – 4:37
 "It's a Beautiful Day" (single version) – 3:57

US CD single
 "Heaven for Everyone" (single version) – 4:37
 "Soul Brother" (recorded in 1981) – 3:36

UK promo CD and 12-inch single
 "Heaven for Everyone" (single version) – 4:37

UK 7-inch Single
A. "Heaven for Everyone" (single version) – 4:37
B. "Heaven for Everyone" (album version) – 5:36

Personnel
The Cross version
 Roger Taylor – vocals, most instruments
 Spike Edney – keyboards, vocals
 Freddie Mercury – guest vocals and backing vocals

Queen version
 Freddie Mercury – lead and backing vocals
 Brian May – electric guitar, backing vocals
 Roger Taylor – drums, keyboards, backing vocals
 John Deacon – bass guitar

Charts and sales

Weekly charts

Year-end charts

Certifications

References

External links
 
 Lyrics at Queen official website

1980s ballads
1987 songs
1988 singles
1995 singles
Georges Méliès
Hollywood Records singles
Music videos directed by David Mallet (director)
Number-one singles in Hungary
Parlophone singles
Queen (band) songs
Rock ballads
Songs written by Roger Taylor (Queen drummer)